During the 2010–11 Belgian football season, Standard Liège competed in the Belgian Pro League.

Season summary
This is the first season since 2003-04 that Standard Liège did not compete in a European competition. Standard Liège started off the season with a 1–1 draw S.V. Zulte-Waregem. Standard Liège won the Belgium Cup defeating K.V.C. Westerlo 2–0 in the final. In the Championship play-off, Standard Liège came in second to qualify for the Champions League Third qualifying round.

At the end of the season, Dominique D'Onofrio's contract ended and was not renewed.

Kit
Liège's kits were sponsored by e-lotto.be and its kit-maker being Planete Rouge.

First-team squad
Squad at end of season

Left the Club

Results

Belgian Cup

Sixth round

Seventh round

Quarterfinals

First legs

Second legs

Standard wins 6–1 on aggregate.

Semifinals

First legs

Second legs

Standard wins 4–3 on aggregate.

Final

References

Standard Liège seasons
Belgian football clubs 2010–11 season